The men's vault competition at the 1952 Summer Olympics was held at Töölö Sports Hall (then "Messuhalli"), Exhibition Hall I from 19 to 21 July. It was the eighth appearance of the event. There were 185 competitors from 29 nations, with nations competing in the team event entering up to 8 gymnasts and other nations able to send up to 3. The event was won by Viktor Chukarin of the Soviet Union, the nation's first medal in the event in its first appearance. Japan also earned its first medal(s): a silver and two bronzes, as Masao Takemoto finished second and there was a tie for third between Takashi Ono and Tadao Uesako.

Background

This was the eighth appearance of the event, which is one of the five apparatus events held every time there were apparatus events at the Summer Olympics (no apparatus events were held in 1900, 1908, 1912, or 1920). Seven of the top 13 (including ties for 10th) gymnasts from 1948 returned: gold medalist Paavo Aaltonen of Finland, silver medalist Olavi Rove of Finland, all three bronze medalists (János Mogyorósi-Klencs and Ferenc Pataki of Hungary and Leo Sotorník of Czechoslovakia), and tenth-place finishers Kalevi Laitinen of Finland and Lajos Tóth of Hungary. The reigning (1950) world champion was Ernst Gebendinger of Switzerland.

Belgium, India, Norway, Poland, Portugal, Saar, South Africa, the Soviet Union, and Spain each made their debut in the men's vault. The United States made its seventh appearance, most of any nation, having missed only the inaugural 1896 Games. Of the 22 different nations that had competed at least once in the event before 1952, 20 competed in Helsinki (only Mexico and the Netherlands were missing among the nations having previously competed).

Competition format

The gymnastics format continued to use the aggregation format. Each nation entered a team of between five and eight gymnasts or up to three individual gymnasts. All entrants in the gymnastics competitions performed both a compulsory exercise and a voluntary exercise for each apparatus. The 2 exercise scores were summed to give a total for the apparatus.

No separate finals were contested.

For each exercise, four judges gave scores from 0 to 10 in one-tenth point increments. The top and bottom scores were discarded and the remaining two scores averaged to give the exercise total. Thus, exercise scores ranged from 0 to 10 and apparatus scores from 0 to 20. 

The event used a "vaulting horse" aligned parallel to the gymnast's run (rather than the modern "vaulting table" in use since 2004). Each competitor had two tries for each of the compulsory and voluntary vaults with the better score to count.

Schedule

All times are Eastern European Summer Time (UTC+3)

Results

References

Men's vault
1952
1952
Men's events at the 1952 Summer Olympics